Camaegeria viettei is a moth of the  family Sesiidae. It is known from eastern Madagascar.

This species has a wingspan of  19.5mm. It is known only from the male holotype that was found in the region of Moramanga.

References

Sesiidae
Moths described in 2012
Moths of Madagascar
Moths of Africa